Paracymoriza olivalis is a moth in the family Crambidae. It was described by George Hampson in 1891. It is found in the Nilgiris District of India.

References

Acentropinae
Moths described in 1891